Crenicichla hadrostigma is a species of cichlid native to South America. It is found in Uruguay.

References

Lucena, C.A.S. de, 2007. Two new species of the genus Crenicichla Heckel, 1840 from the upper rio Uruguay drainage (Perciformes: Cichlidae). Neotrop. Ichthyol. 5(4):449-456

hadrostigma
Fish of Uruguay
Taxa named by Carlos Alberto Santos de Lucena
Fish described in 2007